Zen Cho is a Malaysian fantasy author based in Birmingham, United Kingdom. She is known for her Sorcerer to the Crown series. She was the joint winner of the Crawford Award in 2015 for her short story collection Spirits Abroad.

Biography 
Cho has a law degree from University of Cambridge, and she works as a lawyer. Cho's debut novel, Sorcerer to the Crown, was published in 2015. It was a finalist for the Locus Award for Best First Novel in 2016, and in the same year, Cho won the British Fantasy Award for Best Newcomer. Her novelette "If at First You Don't Succeed, Try, Try Again", published by the B&N Sci-Fi and Fantasy Blog, won the 2019 Hugo Award for Best Novelette.

Awards
Source:

Bibliography

Sorcerer Royal series

Standalone novels and long fiction

Collections

References

External links
 
 

Malaysian novelists
Malaysian short story writers
Malaysian fantasy writers
Malaysian science fiction writers
1986 births
Living people
Women science fiction and fantasy writers
English-language writers from Malaysia
Malaysian expatriates in the United Kingdom
Writers from London
21st-century novelists
21st-century short story writers
21st-century Malaysian women writers
Hugo Award-winning writers